Bedford is a community of the Halifax Regional Municipality, in Nova Scotia, Canada.

History

The area of Bedford has evidence of Indigenous peoples dating back thousands of years. Petroglyphs are found at Bedford Petroglyphs National Historic Site. The Bedford area is known as Kwipek to the Mi'kmaq First Nation.

18th century

On 21 July 1749, Father Le Loutre's War began when Edward Cornwallis arrived to establish Halifax with 13 transports. The British quickly began to build other settlements. To guard against the Acadians, the French, and the Mi'kmaq, British fortifications were erected in Halifax (1749), Bedford (Fort Sackville) (1749), Dartmouth (1750), Lunenburg (1753) and Lawrencetown (1754).

The history of Bedford began when Governor Edward Cornwallis organised his men and began the construction of a road leading to Minas Basin on the Bay of Fundy after establishing the garrison at Halifax. To protect it, he hired John Gorham and his Rangers to erect a fort on the shore of Bedford Basin. It was named Fort Sackville after Lionel Sackville, 1st Duke of Dorset. The area around the fort became known as Sackville until the mid-1850s, when it became Bedford.

In 1752, among the first to receive a large land grant was military officer George Scott in the Fort Sackville area. Scott later participated in the Expulsion of the Acadians, specifically the St. John River Campaign (1758). His brother, Joseph, was paymaster at the Halifax Garrison in the 1760s, received two grants in 1759 and 1765. And built Scott Manor House in 1770.

19th century
Anthony Holland established the Acadian Paper Mill on the Basin around 1819 to provide paper to produce the Halifax newspaper Acadian Recorder.

When the railway went through the station named Millview, the Moirs, Son and Co. moved a part of the Moirs Mill factory to Bedford. The Moirs Mill generating station built in the early 1930s to supply the necessary electricity required to run the factory.

20th century

On 1 July 1980, Bedford was incorporated as a town. The Town only had two Mayors from 1 July 1980 until 1 April 1996; the first Mayor of Bedford was Francene Cosman. The second and final Mayor of Bedford was Peter J. Kelly. Peter J. Kelly would later serve as Mayor of the Municipality of Halifax, from 2000 to 2012.

On 1 April 1996, Halifax County was dissolved and all of its places (cities, suburbs, towns, and villages) were turned into communities of a single-tier municipality named Halifax Regional Municipality. Subsequently, Bedford was turned into a community within the new Municipality of Halifax.

23 March 1997 issue of Maclean's magazine rated Bedford as being the "Best Community to Live in Canada."

21st century
In 2019, the provincial electoral-district of Bedford South electoral district was created to reflect the community's growing population in that area.

Geography
Bedford covers 3,979 hectares (39.79 km2) of land area.

Culture

Recreation
There is a popular walkway along much of the Bedford Basin waterfront that begins at DeWolf park, and continues as the Bedford-Sackville Connector Greenway, a crushed gravel covered trail that meanders along the Sackville River.

On Shore Drive, there is an outdoor 25-metre pool and smaller splash pool located at Lions Park, and in the summer there are numerous lakes suitable for swimming.

Bedford is a well-established sailing community, and is home to the Bedford Basin Yacht Club and Marina.

Sports
The community is currently home to six ice surfaces, at the BMO Centre, Lebrun Centre, and the Gary Martin Dome.

The topography of the area limits the possible locations for football-and-soccer fields. However, there are fields at Basinview Drive Community School, Bedford South School, Charles P. Allen High School, Range Park, Rocky Lake Junior High, and Sunnyside Elementary (Eaglewood location).

Traditions
Bedford Days has occurred annually at the end of June and beginning of July for over 30 years. Currently, most of the events take place at DeWolf Park. There is an opening celebration, a Canada Day celebration, free pancake-breakfast, dog show, Kids' Extravaganza, Kids' Triathlon, Movies in the Park, the Rubber Duck Dash, and the Scott Manor House Tea Party.

The Light Up Bedford Parade is an annual parade that takes place on the Sunday following the Light Up Halifax Parade, which usually is mid-November. It runs along the Bedford Highway from Bedford Place Mall and ends at DeWolf Park. At the park there is Christmas carol singing, contests-and-prizes, and a hot chocolate stand. At the conclusion of the parade, a Christmas Tree is lit. In addition to bringing the community together to celebrate the beginning of the Christmas season, the parade serves as a fundraiser for the Turkey Club Society—which raises funds to ensure residents of Municipality of Halifax are able to provide a Christmas dinner for their families.

Demographics

Although a well-established community, Bedford has not had demographic information released from the 2006, 2011, 2016, and the 2021 Canadian Censuses. As of the 1996 Census, before the amalgamation of Halifax on 1 April 1996, the Town of Bedford had 13,638 people—a population density of 342 people per km2.

Education

Depending on where they live, students may attend the following schools in the Bedford area:

Public Schools
Basinview Drive Elementary School - Grades Primary to 5
Bedford South School - Grades Primary to 6
BFEC (Bedford and Forsyth Education Centers) - Grades 10 to 12, Ages 16 and up, the replacement for FLEC's
Charles P. Allen High School - Grade 10 to Grade 12
Eaglewood Drive Elementary  -  Primary to grade 6, but offers early French immersion in grade two
Fort Sackville Elementary  - Grades Primary and grade one, entirely French immersion Since 2015 but began in 2001 
Rocky Lake Elementary - Grades 5 to 6
Rocky Lake Junior High School  - Grades 7 to 9
Waverley Road Elementary - Grades Primary to 3 (closed in 2012)

Private Schools
Bedford Academy - Grades Primary to 9
Sandy Lake Seventh Day Adventist Academy - Grades Primary to 12

Transportation
Bedford is well served by highways, roads, sidewalks-and-walking paths, taxis, and transit.

The community is served by Halifax's transit authority, Halifax Transit. Routes 8, 87, 90, 91 and 93 directly serve Bedford while many more routes serve the nearby Cobequid Terminal in Lower Sackville.

Recently, there have been several different modes of public-transportation proposed within Halifax to support its current and continued growth. There is a fast ferry service planned for the Mill Cove area that would connect to the Ferry Terminal in Downtown Halifax. Furthermore, there have been proposals to re-introduce Commuter (Light) Rail within Halifax's urban area. However, these proposed services are controversial due to disputes over projected costs and ridership levels.

Notable residents
Francene Cosman - First Mayor of Bedford, former MLA and cabinet minister, former President of the NS Status of Women.
Brendan Croskerry - Musician.
Nate Darling - NBA basketball player.
Harry DeWolf - first captain of HMCS Haida (G63).
Ante Jazic - Soccer player for MLS team Chivas USA.
Shawn MacKenzie - Professional hockey player.
Geoff Regan - Member of Parliament for Halifax West, which includes Bedford and the 36th Speaker of the Canadian House of Commons.
Kelly Regan - Member of the Nova Scotia House of Assembly for Bedford-Birch Cove, which includes Bedford.
Laura Regan - Canadian movie star and multiple televised guest star
Nancy Regan - television host and self-employed
Chase Tang - actor and mental health advocate

References
Notes

Sources
 Grenier, John. The Far Reaches of Empire. War in Nova Scotia, 1710-1760. Norman: U of Oklahoma P, 2008.
 
 
 
 http://www.lightupbedfordparade.com/#About_The_Parade

External links

 The "Bedford Beacon" Community Information site

Communities in Halifax, Nova Scotia
Former towns in Nova Scotia
Populated places established in 1750
Populated places disestablished in 1996